Froriepia is a genus of mites in the family Acaridae.

Species
 Froriepia vimariensis Vitzthum, 1919
 Froriepia heterotricha Mahunka, 1978
 Froriepia negmi Eraky, 1999

References

Acaridae
Acari genera